Terence Charles Bacon is a Canadian former diplomat. He was concurrently High Commissioner to Zambia and Malawi and Ambassador Extraordinary and Plenipotentiary to Mozambique. He was also High Commissioner to Zimbabwe and Ambassador Extraordinary and Plenipotentiary to Czechoslovakia, Yugoslavia, Bulgaria and Albania.

External links 
 Foreign Affairs and International Trade Canada Complete List of Posts

References 

Year of birth missing (living people)
Living people
High Commissioners of Canada to Malawi
Ambassadors of Canada to Mozambique
High Commissioners of Canada to Zambia
High Commissioners of Canada to Zimbabwe
Ambassadors of Canada to Czechoslovakia
Ambassadors of Canada to Yugoslavia
Ambassadors of Canada to Bulgaria
Ambassadors of Canada to Albania